Moordorf is a village in the German state of Lower Saxony. It is in the municipality of Südbrookmerland in the district of Aurich.

Moordorf's most notable feature is the Moormuseum Moordorf, showing what life was like in the small huts on the East Frisian moors.

Politics 
Moordorf is the densest populated suburb in the municipality of Südbrookmerland. The mayor is Stefan Kleinert (SPD).

After World War II Moordorf was a stronghold of the SPD. In the first elections of 1949, the SPD received 30% of the votes. By 1990, the SPD received 70% of the vote.

References

External links
 Moormuseum Moordorf

Villages in Lower Saxony
Towns and villages in East Frisia